Diana Muldaur (born August 19, 1938) is an American film and television actress. Muldaur's television roles include Rosalind Shays on L.A. Law and Dr. Katherine Pulaski in the second season of Star Trek: The Next Generation. She also appeared in two episodes of Star Trek: The Original Series in the late 1960s, playing two different roles (Dr. Miranda Jones and Ann Mulhall). She has been nominated for an Emmy twice, as a supporting actress on L.A. Law in 1990 and 1991.

Born in Brooklyn, New York, and raised on the Massachusetts island of Martha's Vineyard, Muldaur started acting in high school and continued on through college, graduating from Sweet Briar College in Virginia in 1960. She studied acting under Stella Adler, and made her name on the New York stage. She was at one point a board member of the Screen Actors Guild and was the first woman to serve as president of the Academy of Television Arts & Sciences (1983–1985).

Early career
In 1965, Muldaur landed the role of Ann Wicker in the CBS daytime soap opera The Secret Storm. She then did a five-episode arc as Jeannie Orloff in the final season of Richard Chamberlain's NBC medical drama, Dr. Kildare.

Various roles as a guest star in episodes of numerous television shows followed, including Bonanza, I Spy, The Courtship of Eddie's Father, The Invaders, Mannix, Mod Squad, Hawaii Five-O, The F.B.I., The Virginian, a two-episode arc on the Ben Gazzara drama Run for Your Life, and as a guest star in 1975 in S.W.A.T. playing Kate Darby in the episode "Terror Ship".

Multiple collaborations between Muldaur and Burt Reynolds began when Muldaur appeared in an episode of Hawk (1966), a weekly procedural with Reynolds in the title role. Subsequently, they both guest-starred in a third-season episode of The F.B.I. (1968), and Muldaur guest-starred in an episode of Reynolds' series Dan August (1970).

In 1967, Muldaur guest-starred on the Gunsmoke episode "Fandango" with James Arness. An excerpt of that episode's dialogue was sampled on the Pink Floyd album The Wall, after "Hey You" and before the brief song "Is There Anybody Out There?"

In 1968, she appeared in the original Star Trek episodes "Return to Tomorrow" as Science Officer Dr. Ann Mulhall, and in "Is There in Truth No Beauty?" as Dr. Miranda Jones. During this time, a friendship with creator Gene Roddenberry formed that led to him casting Muldaur as Marg in the television movie Planet Earth (1974) with John Saxon. Later, she appeared as Dr. Katherine Pulaski in 20 episodes of the second season of Star Trek: The Next Generation (1988–1989).

Muldaur's first major role was as Belle in the ABC primetime serial Harold Robbins' The Survivors (1970). The soap, intended as a comeback vehicle for Hollywood star Lana Turner, was cancelled early into the 1970 television season after 15 episodes.

Supporting roles in films
After the cancellation of The Survivors, Muldaur accepted a number of supporting roles in motion pictures, including The Swimmer (1968) with Burt Lancaster, football film Number One (1969), and psychological thriller The Other (1972) with Uta Hagen. She also appeared in Sidney J. Furie's The Lawyer (1970), One More Train to Rob (1971) with George Peppard, and the John Wayne crime drama, McQ (1974).

Muldaur appeared in the ensemble-apocalypse thriller Chosen Survivors (1974) with Jackie Cooper, Richard Jaeckel, and Barbara Babcock. In 1977, she played Elaine Mati, the concerned wife of mentally unstable doctor Telly Savalas in the independent film Beyond Reason.

Other television guest-starring roles
In 1967, Muldaur guest-starred on Mannix episode "Coffin for a Clown". In 1971, she appeared as Rachel Bonham in The Men From Shiloh (rebranded name for the TV Western The Virginian) in the episode titled "The Politician". Muldaur guest-starred in a first-season episode of Alias Smith and Jones, "The Great Shell Game" in 1971. In the second season of Kung Fu in 1973, opposite David Carradine, she guest-starred in the episode "The Elixir" playing a traveling-show woman who yearned for freedom from men—topical at the time—and starred in the pilot episode of Charlie's Angels. In a 1972 Hawaii Five-O episode, she was a guest star along with Ricardo Montalbán.

She had a recurring role as Judge Eleanor Hooper on The Tony Randall Show during the show's 1976–1978 run, and was a guest star in season two of Fantasy Island. Muldaur guest-starred on The Incredible Hulk, playing the part of Helen Banner, David Banner's sister, in the season-three episode "Homecoming" in November 1979. In 1981, she played a nun in the fifth-season episode "Sanctuary".

In 1975, she made a guest appearance in an episode of The Rockford Files as Mrs. Bannister, a married woman who has an affair with a former cellmate of the series' title character. During this time, Muldaur also appeared on Police Woman, Quincy M.E., The Streets of San Francisco, The Love Boat, The Hardy Boys/Nancy Drew Mysteries, and Hart to Hart, among others. She appeared in the first season of Angela Lansbury's Murder, She Wrote.

In 1986, she also appeared in a commercial for Muzzy in Gondoland

Recurring television roles

1970s–1980s 
Muldaur had a recurring role on the seven-season Dennis Weaver mystery anthology McCloud as Chris Couglin, McCloud's love interest. Her character was introduced in the pilot episode in 1970, and made her last of 16 appearances in April 1977. She reprised her role as Chris for the 1989 reunion movie The Return of Sam McCloud.

Muldaur was cast as conservationist Joy Adamson in the television drama Born Free about Elsa the Lioness. Filming for the ambitious project, which co-starred Gary Collins, took place in Kenya, and the NBC series, which debuted in the fall of 1974, lasted one season. Guest stars on Born Free included several of Muldaur's future co-stars, including Alex Cord (Chosen Survivors) and Susan Dey (L.A. Law).

In 1979, Muldaur starred with David Huddleston in the short-lived NBC sitcom Hizzonner, which lasted just seven episodes and co-starred Kathy Cronkite, daughter of news presenter Walter Cronkite. She played the mayor's secretary, Ginny.

First an Emmy-winning miniseries and then a weekly drama, A Year in the Life was a critical success for NBC, with a cast including Richard Kiley and Sarah Jessica Parker. As Dr. Alice Foley, Muldaur praised the show as an example of how television was becoming more realistic about women.

Star Trek: The Next Generation
Muldaur is known for playing "dignified, sophisticated characters". Gene Roddenberry was already familiar with Muldaur from her second-season appearance in the Star Trek episode, "Return to Tomorrow", and later in a third-season appearance in "Is There in Truth No Beauty?". He subsequently cast her in his 1973 TV movie Planet Earth. Consequently, for the second season of Star Trek: The Next Generation, Roddenberry chose her specifically to replace the outgoing Gates McFadden (who was let go at the insistence of one of the show's first-season producers). Muldaur was cast to play the role of Dr. Pulaski, the new chief medical officer. "We needed someone with a little more of an edge," Rick Berman explained of the choice. "Kate's a strong, confident woman with an edge who can hold her own with Captain Picard. Their relationship is not all that unlike the one between Kirk and McCoy ... although from the onset we had no intention of trying to duplicate the original team."

Muldaur said after her casting

Of Pulaski's willingness to stand up to the captain, Muldaur said

Some television critics praised Muldaur's performance, with one noting her "wry, no-nonsense warmth that plays nicely off of some of the icier regulars". The addition of Muldaur, along with Whoopi Goldberg, also served to redress the absence of women from the principal cast, as the departure of McFadden and Denise Crosby had left only Marina Sirtis, a rapid attrition of women that recalled the imbalance of the original Star Trek series.

Ultimately, Muldaur found working on the syndicated show an "unhappy" experience, saying, "The imagination and joy wasn't there". "Everybody was out for themselves. I don't think they were happy to have me there." "It wasn't what I hoped it would be. I thought it would be wonderfully inventive and wonderfully creative, and I found it was not any of those things, but it did give me Trekkies. I love Trekkies. I find them very dear."

The character also proved unpopular with some fans, who among other things found her treatment of the lovable android Data to be mean-spirited. Muldaur left the series after a season. Show representatives denied that she had been fired, saying, "Technically, she's just not returning", while other sources said that her option had not been renewed. Roddenberry described Muldaur as "a most talented actress" and said that the decision "to let her go was made solely because the hoped-for chemistry between her and the rest of the starship cast did not develop." Berman added, "The thought of bringing Gates back was a good idea to us. The feeling was that we had perhaps made a mistake, and the best way to remedy it was to bring her back." The "revolving door" and the limited opportunities for female crew led critics to suggest that the mostly male series still had a problem featuring women.

L.A. Law
Muldaur subsequently earned two Emmy nominations for her role as lawyer Rosalind Shays on L.A. Law. Of Roz's creation, by prolific television writer David E. Kelley, Muldaur said:

In one episode of the Stephen Bochco drama, Jill Eikenberry's character Ann Kelsey tells Shays: "If you were a man, you'd be applauded for your achievements." Muldaur insisted her character "was just too strong for a lot of men".

Muldaur described the L.A. Law actors as "the closest family", and said she was "thrilled" to play a villain like Shays after portraying "everybody's mistress for 20 years", and expressed fascination with the public reception for Shays:

The surprise scene where Roz and Leland are seen in bed together was ranked as the 38th-greatest moment in television in an issue of EGG magazine. Equally spectacular was Roz's fatal exit from the show, falling down an elevator shaft. Muldaur joked: "I was as shocked as everybody else. I thought maybe I had asked for too much money!"

Jill Eikenberry, who played Ann Kelsey on L.A. Law, said on E! True Hollywood Story that the whole L.A. Law cast loved the dynamic between Muldaur and Richard Dysart, and that they were all very sad to see Muldaur leave the show.

Other television series
In 1975, Muldaur appeared in one episode in the first season of The Rockford Files. In 1977, she guest-starred in the second episode ("Mirror Image") of the short-lived CBS espionage series Hunter. Early in 1979, she guest-starred in the second episode  ("Dewey and Harold and Sarah and Maggie") of the NBC anthology series $weepstake$. In the early 1990s, she also guest-starred on two episodes of Matlock, as well as Empty Nest with Richard Mulligan and the pilot for Aaron Spelling's Hearts Are Wild.  Muldaur provided the voice of Dr. Leslie Thompkins on Batman: The Animated Series from 1992 to 1994.

Television films
In 1973, Muldaur co-starred in the television film Call to Danger as Carrie Donovon, a Justice Department investigator. In 1974, Muldaur starred in The Wonderful World of Disney movie presentation of Hog Wild! with John Ericson and Kim Richards for NBC. In 1979, she starred in the made-for-television film version of The Miracle Worker in which she played the role of Katie Keller, the mother of Helen Keller. The NBC film starred Melissa Gilbert and Patty Duke Astin. 

In an attempt to capitalize on Burt Reynolds' international superstardom, Muldaur's performance in the pilot episode of the Reynolds-Norman Fell crime series, Dan August (1970–1971) was edited together with a subsequent episode and repackaged as a 1980 ABC Movie of the Week titled Dan August: The Jealousy Factor.

In 1991, Muldaur played Lauren Jeffreys, the main client of Perry Mason (Raymond Burr) in the NBC television movie Perry Mason and the Case of the Fatal Fashion. Muldaur had previously worked with Burr as a guest star on the detective series Ironside (1971) and his short-lived series Kingston: Confidential (1977).

Her other television films include the Black Beauty miniseries (1977), Pine Canyon is Burning (1977), Maneaters Are Loose! (1978), The Word (1978), and Joseph Wambaugh's two-hour film Police Story: A Cry for Justice (1978) with Dennis Weaver and Larry Hagman. Muldaur teamed with The Smothers Brothers for Terror at Alcatraz (1982) and turned in strong dramatic performances in Murder in Three Acts (1986) opposite Peter Ustinov and Locked Up: A Mother's Rage (1991) with Jean Smart and Angela Bassett.

Personal life
Muldaur is a 1960 graduate of Sweet Briar College, a small, private, women's school in central Virginia.

She is the older sister of singer-songwriter Geoff Muldaur, who is the former husband of singer Maria Muldaur. She is also the aunt of singer-songwriter Jenni Muldaur and singer-songwriter Clare Muldaur-Manchon. She lived in Los Angeles from 1970 to 1991.

Muldaur was married to actor James Vickery, her co-star on The Secret Storm, until his death from cancer in 1979. She then married writer and producer Robert Dozier (son of producer William Dozier), who died of prostate cancer in 2012.

Muldaur is a former Airedale Terrier breeder and owner.

At one point, Muldaur contemplated a face lift, noting in 2000 at the age of 61, "You don't see many people my age on television", but eventually decided against it, remarking, "Somebody has to look the right age." Her stated ambition is "to play all the great women's roles... I'd love to play Lady Macbeth."

Selected filmography

References

External links
 
 
 

American film actresses
American voice actresses
American television actresses
Sweet Briar College alumni
People from Martha's Vineyard, Massachusetts
Actresses from New York City
1938 births
Living people
20th-century American actresses
Actresses from Massachusetts
21st-century American women